Cornelius Herz  (formerly written Hertz) was born in Besançon, France on September 3, 1845, and he died in Bournemouth, England on July 6, 1898. He was a French-American doctor, electrician, businessman and famous politician of Jewish German descent, implicated in the Panama scandals.

Personal life
Cornelius's German parents, Adelaide (née Friedmann from Bavaria) and Leopold Herz, emigrated from Hesse to the United States in 1848. They settled in the State of New York and by 1853 they had all become naturalized American citizens in New York City. Cornelius entered the College of the City of New York in 1858 and in 1861 he was a lieutenant in the United States army. He graduated with honours from the College of the City of New York in 1864. With a Bachelor of Science and Master of Arts, he went to study at the Universities of Heidelberg and of Paris. After matriculating at the School of Medicine of Paris, he became surgeon-major on the staff of General Chanzy in the French army of the Loire when the Franco-Prussian War broke out in 1870 and was made Knight of the Legion of Honour in January 1871, for his distinguished services. In the spring of the same year he was appointed medical officer of the Maritime Hospital of Berck-sur-Mer.

In the fall of 1871 Cornelius returned to America and arrived in Chicago, where his parents were living at the time, to witness the Great Chicago Fire. He was immediately charged with a medical sanitary mission in connection with, and during, its reconstruction. In 1872, he was elected Chief Medical Officer of the Mount Sinai Hospital in New York. In 1873 he married in Boston the daughter of one of his patients, Bianca Saroni, and the following year they moved to San Francisco, where he was appointed a member of the Board of Health. Here he specialized in nervous illnesses and his attention was drawn to the adaptation of electricity to practical purposes and he founded the California Electrical Works. In September 1877, with George Prescott, Thomas Edison signs an agreement with Stephen Field and Cornelius Herz regarding European quadruplex patents.

Career
In 1877 Cornelius and Bianca Saroni returned to Paris with their two infant daughters, Irma and Edna. Their son Ralph was born here, who later became a famous stage actor and three more daughters, Olga, Sybil and Adelaide. In Paris he became the head of the movement for extending the use of electricity, which had its headquarters there. He founded the Electric-Force Transmission Company under the Marcel Deprez patents. According to an article by Sir Edward James Reed, which appeared in the Fortnightly Review of January, 1897:

He founded and edited the first scientific reviews on electricity, La Lumiere Electrique and the Journal d’Electricite`. At this time he also, with the most important banks of Paris, founded societies for electric lighting and for telephony in many European countries. In conjunction with the banking house of Rothschilds, the Northern Railway of France, and the Creuzot Works, he established the Society for the Construction and Maintenance of Electrical Machinery, Apparatus, Cables, etc., the Society for Brazing by Electricity, the Society for the Manufacture of a Special System of Small-bore Guns, the Society for the Application of Electric Light to Railway Trains, the Society for the Construction of Telephone Apparatus, etc. He was the originator and principal founder of the Society for Working the State Telephonic-Telegraphic Trunk Lines, with a capital of 100,000,000 francs, a gigantic scheme to interconnect the 36,000 communes of France by a perpetual day and night uninterrupted telephonic-telegraphic service, and to connect villages and the smallest hamlets at a uniform rate (names and addresses free) of  one half-penny per word.”

In 1878 the Government made him Officer of the Legion of Honour. President Garfield appointed Dr. Herz an official representative of the United States Government to the International Congress of Electricians in Paris in 1881 and that same year he was raised to the rank of Commander of the Legion of Honour. In 1879 he formed the Paris Electric-Light Company and in 1880 he invented a telephone system that assured a better transmission of the voice over long distance. In 1883 Herz was the founder, along with Alphonse de Rothschild, of the American Syndicate of Electricity, which afterwards amalgamated with the Westinghouse Syndicate. In 1886, he became Grand Officer of the Legion of Honour.

Dr. Herz's whole life up to 1892 was devoted to work, to great enterprises, and to science, and his efforts in these paths were applauded by the vast majority of the members of the French Academy of Sciences, by different Governments, and by many of the world's greatest men. He received high distinctions from the Government of Bavaria, where he was made Commander of the Holy Order of St. Michael, and from King Umberto I who created him Grand Cross of the Order of St. Maurice and Lazare of Italy. He soon acquired a prominent position in the political world of France.

Panama scandal
Dr. Herz was in England, where they had always passed the winter, with his family in 1892, when the Panama scandals broke upon France. Dr. Herz was appealed to by members of the Government then in power to return to France, which he did. Soon after, Baron Jacques de Reinach committed suicide and Dr. Herz returned to the Tankerville Hotel in Bournemouth. Some believe that a perfectly innocent man, Dr. Herz, was made a scapegoat for certain foreign intrigues which had grown very powerful. It was common knowledge in Paris that Baron Reinach and Dr. Herz had been associated together during a dozen years and more in vast commercial undertakings, involving financial transactions amounting to many millions. The pursuit of Dr. Herz was aided by the greed of some persons in the camp of the Reinachs, who sought to acquire fortune through the downfall of a man whom they now were only too willing to consider an adversary, by taking advantage of the tragic circumstances attending the Baron's death, and of the confusion in which he had left his affairs. It was also believed that Dr. Herz held evidence against prominent politicians and financiers.

Georges Clemenceau's political judgement was called into question by his flirtation with the demagogic General Boulanger and by his friendship with the "crooked financier", Cornelius Herz, who was heavily implicated in the Panama Scandal. Clemenceau blamed Herz for having lost his seat in the 1893 parliamentary elections; he looked for a time to be finished politically.

The charge thus artificially fixed upon by the French Government was alleged extortion from the late Baron Reinach – a preposterous charge that was never adduced by the Baron himself in his lifetime, and had no visible foundation in law or in fact. But first, in order to evade the Legion of Honour difficulty, which prohibited an ordinary magistrate from acting, the French Government were compelled to resort to having Dr. Herz struck off the rolls of the Legion of Honour, which they did, contrary to the statutes of the Order of the Legion, without a prior hearing. In order to stop his counsel from producing his proofs of Baron de Reinach's debt to Dr. Herz (consisting of documents on stamped paper duly dated and signed by the Baron, and held by the Rothschilds in their bank) the presiding Judge took advantage of the technicality that the documents were insufficiently stamped, a pure oversight doubtless on the part of men of business, and required that a fine amounting to about L 50,000 sterling should be paid before their introduction as evidence be admitted. This was prohibitory, and absolute conclusive evidence of a debt was, although examined by the Judges and tacitly admitted to be true, suppressed by the Court. Shortly afterwards another occasion presented itself to impoverish Dr. Herz by compelling his wife to transfer to him property which had always stood in her name. The pretext for this course seems to have been that the Judges of the Court alleged that the property was purchased with Dr. Herz's money, and therefore should have been in his name. Various properties of Dr. and Mrs. Herz in Paris and Aix-lesBains were practically confiscated and torn from him. His Paris property, which had been constantly increasing in importance, was sold for several million francs less than its true value. It is also a fact that during the very time the French were persecuting Dr. Herz, by processes in the Civil and Criminal Courts in Paris, by utilizing the Extradition Treaty with England, and by public vilification through the Parisian Press – who accused him of being a traitor, a spy in the pay of England, an incendiary, a murderer, and guilty of a whole host of minor crimes – prominent members of the various Governmental and Opposition groups were constantly giving assurances to Madame Herz, and friends of the Doctor, as well as to his legal representatives, that all would soon be “set right.” After keeping Dr. Herz under wrongful arrest for three and a half years, the French Government withdrew their charges and said they had made a mistake. The shocking treatment for so many years inflicted upon Dr. Herz was pronounced an absolute prosecution. In 1906, eight years after his death, he was exonerated completely.

Tomb
The embalmed bodies of Cornelius and his father Leopold were supposed to be kept temporarily at Willesden Jewish Cemetery in London, before being taken to America, but the relocation did not happen and eventually the bodies were buried at Willesden: Leopold in section B, row R1, grave 8, on 24 August 1896; Cornelius in section K, row G, grave 3, on 11 July 1898.

References

External links
DR CORNELIUS HERZ, A Curious Story
DR. CORNELIUS HERZ AND THE PANAMA SCANDALS, 1897.
The Case of Dr. Cornelius Herz, 1893

19th-century French physicians
French engineers
French people of German-Jewish descent
French financiers
Union Army officers
1845 births
1898 deaths
Officiers of the Légion d'honneur
19th-century French businesspeople